Events in the year 2023 in San Marino.

Incumbents 
 Captains Regent: 
Maria Luisa Berti, Manuel Ciavatta 
 Secretary for Foreign and Political Affairs: Luca Beccari

Events 

2022–23 Campionato Sammarinese di Calcio
2022–23 Coppa Titano

Deaths

See also 

 2023 in Europe
 City states

References 

 
2020s in San Marino
Years of the 21st century in San Marino
San Marino
San Marino